Montesa may refer to:
 Montesa Honda, a Spanish motorcycle manufacturer
 Order of Montesa, a Christian military order
 Montesa, Valencia, Spain